State Route 15 (SR 15) is a west–east route from Memphis to Monteagle.  For much of its route it has an unsigned concurrency with U.S. Route 64. SR 15 does travel through the southern part of all 3 Grand Divisions of the state: West Tennessee, Middle Tennessee, and East Tennessee.

Route description

Shelby County

SR 15 begins as a secondary highway in Shelby County in Northern Memphis at an interchange with SR 14 (Austin Peay Highway). It proceeds east to Bartlett and intersects US 70/US 79/US 64/SR 1, where it becomes the unsigned companion route of US 64 and becomes a primary highway. US 64/SR 15 then intersect SR 177 just before they have an interchange with I-40 (Exit 18) in Lakeland. They then go east and pass just north of Lenow before having an interchange with I-269 (Winfield Dunn Parkway/Memphis Outer Beltway) (Exit 15), in Eads. Not even a half mile away, they intersect with SR 205 before crossing into Fayette County.

Fayette County

US 64/SR 15 then passes through Hickory Withe and has a junction with SR 196. They then enter Oakland and has an intersection with SR 194, before continuing east. They continue through rural farmland, passing by Glengary Lake. US 64/SR 15 then enter Somerville and have an intersection with SR 76 in downtown. They then pass through Laconia, where they cross over the Loosahatchie River, before crossing into Hardeman County.

Hardeman County

They then enter Whiteville, where US 64 Bus begins and goes east through downtown while US 64/SR 15 follow a new bypass to the south. It also junctions with SR 179. They then meet up with the other end of US 64 Bus and go east to have an intersection with SR 100, before US 64/SR 15 leave Whitville and continue southeast. They then enter Bolivar and become concurrent with SR 18. They then enter downtown and have a junction with SR 125, with SR 18 splitting off and going north along that highway. US 64/SR 15 then leave Bolivar and continue east. They then go through some wooded areas, where they cross the Hatchie River, and pass through Hornsby before crossing into McNairy County.

McNairy County

They then intersect SR 225 before going through some rural wooded areas and then entering Selmer, at an interchange with US 45/SR 5, which US 64 follows as a new bypass to the south while SR 15 goes through downtown, signed as US 64 BUS. SR 15 then goes east through downtown and comes to another junction with US 45/US 64/SR 5, with the road continuing east as US 45/SR 5 and SR 15 joins US 64 again and they go northeast. US 64/SR 15 then intersect and have a short concurrency with SR 224 just north of Stantonville before entering Adamsville. In Adamsville, they have an intersection with SR 22 and SR 117 in the center of town, with SR 22 joining the concurrency. US 64/SR 15/SR 22 then leave Adamsville and cross into Hardin County.

Hardin County

They then enter Crump and have an intersection and become concurrent with SR 69. A short distance later, SR 22 branches off and turns south. They then run along the banks of the Tennessee River before crossing it and entering Savannah. In Savannah, they immediately enter downtown and pass by the Tennessee River Museum, and becoming concurrent with SR 128 before coming to an intersection with SR 203, where SR 69 turns south, SR 203 goes east, and US 64/SR 15/SR 128 go northeast to leave Savannah. They then intersect SR 226 before north of Olivet before SR 128 splits off and goes north. US 64/SR 15 then go through some mountains and pass through Olivehill before crossing into Wayne County.

Wayne County

They enter Clifton Junction where they intersect US 641/SR 114. US 64/SR 15 then go through a narrow valley before entering Waynesboro, bypassing the city to the west and north. It then has an interchange with SR 13 and crosses over the Green River before going east to intersect with SR 99. US 64/SR 15 then leave Waynesboro and continue east through mountainous terrain. They then enter some farmland and have an interchange with the Natchez Trace Parkway just before crossing into Lawrence County.

Lawrence County

They then intersect with SR 240 in Deerfield and then SR 241 just a little further to the east. They then enter Lawrenceburg. Just west of downtown, US 64 Bus begins and goes east into downtown, while US 64/SR 15 follow a new bypass to the south. They then have an interchange with SR 242 and cross over Shoal Creek, just south of New Shoal Creek Dam, shortly there after. They then have an interchange with US 43/SR 6 before passing through largely rural areas. They then come back around to meet the other end of US 64 Bus before leaving Lawrenceburg and continuing east through more mountains. US 64/SR 15 then cross into Giles County.

Giles County

It then passes through Bodenham before intersecting and becoming concurrent with SR 166 and entering Pulaski. US 64 then bypasses the city to the south with SR 15/SR 166 going into downtown. SR 166 splits and turns south at an intersection with SR 11, with SR 11 becoming concurrent with SR 15. They then come to an intersection with US 31/SR 7, where SR 11 splits off and goes north along that highway. SR 15 then goes east back to US 64, where they continue east together. They go through some more mountains before coming to an interchange with I-65 (Exit 14) in Frankewing. US 64/SR 15 then cross into Lincoln County.

Lincoln County

They then pass through Boonshill and intersect with SR 244. They then intersect with SR 273 before entering Fayetteville and coming to an intersection with US 64 Bypass, a new southern bypass of the city. US 64/SR 15 then go through downtown to intersect SR 50/US 431 and become concurrent with SR 50. They then come to another intersection with US 64 Bypass, which at this point is also concurrent with US 231/SR 10. SR 50 then splits off and goes north at another intersection before US 64/SR 15 go east and leave Fayetteville. They continue east through farmland and mountains to cross the Elk River before passing through Kelso. They then pass just north of Flintville and junction with SR 275. They then intersect and have a short concurrency with SR 121 before entering Franklin County.

Franklin County

US 64/SR 15 then enter Huntland, where they have a junction with SR 122 and SR 97. They then pass through Belvidere before entering Winchester and having an interchange with SR 16, which provides access to downtown as US 64/SR 433 bypass it to the southeast, and SR 15 splits from US 64 again to follow SR 16, becoming a secondary highway. They then have an intersection with US 41A and SR 50, where SR 15 splits from SR 16 to follow US 41A. US 41A/SR 15 then goes through Cowan and goes east to a long narrow mountain pass. They then enter Sewanee and become concurrent with SR 56. They go east to Saint Andrews where they intersect SR 156 before crossing into Marion County.

Marion and Grundy Counties

It then straddles the line with Grundy County before having an interchange with I-24/US 64 (Exit 134) and become a primary highway again. They then enter Monteagle and SR 15 ends at an intersection with US 41/SR 2 just west of downtown.

Major intersections

See also
List of state routes in Tennessee

References

015
Transportation in Memphis, Tennessee
Transportation in Shelby County, Tennessee
Transportation in Fayette County, Tennessee
Transportation in Hardeman County, Tennessee
Transportation in McNairy County, Tennessee
Transportation in Hardin County, Tennessee
Transportation in Wayne County, Tennessee
Transportation in Lawrence County, Tennessee
Transportation in Giles County, Tennessee
Transportation in Lincoln County, Tennessee
Transportation in Franklin County, Tennessee
Transportation in Marion County, Tennessee
Transportation in Grundy County, Tennessee